Arnhem Centraal railway station is the largest railway station in the city of Arnhem in Gelderland, Netherlands. It was opened on 14 May 1845 and is located on the Amsterdam–Arnhem railway, the Arnhem–Leeuwarden railway and the Arnhem–Nijmegen railway. The station opened at the same time as the Amsterdam–Arnhem railway, that continues into Germany via the Oberhausen–Arnhem railway.

The station is the main station of Arnhem, and at present, has around 40,000 passengers that use the station per day, this makes it the 9th busiest station in the Netherlands. The main building has a surface of 18,000 m2 and a volume of 76,000 m3, the building has a capacity of 110.000 transfers per day.

Building

In 2006 a reconstruction of the complete station area started. In October of that year, a temporary station entrance opened, that could only be reached by three sets of stairs (or by elevators). On 2 July 2011, a new tunnel under the platforms opened. The temporary entrance closed down and dismantled in the autumn of 2011. As of that period the railway consists of four platforms including a footbridge connecting all platforms.

During the summer of 2011 a new dive under was created west of the station which allows trains to Nijmegen and Utrecht to underpass all tracks without interfering the other train services. All traffic on the western part of the station was completely suspended for five weeks. The dive under officially opened on 29 August 2011. The official re-opening of the completed station was on 19 November 2015, on this day the station was renamed Arnhem Centraal, formerly it had just been Arnhem.

The new design of the railway station was created by UNStudio in collaboration with Cecil Balmond at Arup AGU. It won the Dutch Nationale Staalprijs.

Train services

The station is served by the following train services:
International:
Intercity-Express: Amsterdam - Utrecht - Arnhem - Cologne - Frankfurt Airport - Basel
Intercity-Express: Amsterdam - Utrecht - Arnhem - Cologne - Frankfurt
Regional Express: Arnhem - Emmerich - Wesel - Oberhausen - Duisburg - Düsseldorf
National:
Express:
Intercity: Den Helder - Amsterdam - Utrecht - Arnhem - Nijmegen
Intercity: Schiphol - Utrecht - Arnhem - Nijmegen
Intercity: Zwolle - Arnhem - Nijmegen - Oss - 's-Hertogenbosch - Tilburg - Breda - Roosendaal
Local:
Sprinter: Arnhem - Nijmegen -  Oss - 's-Hertogenbosch - Tilburg - Breda - Dordrecht
Sprinter: Ede-Wageningen - Arnhem
Sprinter: Zutphen - Arnhem - Nijmegen (- Wijchen on weekdays)
Stoptrein: Arnhem - Zevenaar - Doetinchem
Stoptrein: Arnhem - Zevenaar - Doetinchem - Winterswijk
Stoptrein: Tiel - Elst - Arnhem

Bus services

The bus services depart from the covered bus station underneath the Essent towers and from the area in front of the main entrance. Arnhem is known for its trolleybus service in the Netherlands. They operate on a number of city services.

Bus services are operated by a variety of operators; city services are operated by Breng and regional services by Breng, Arriva and Syntus.

KLM also operates a bus service for KLM customers from the train station to Schiphol Airport.

City services
 1 De Laar West - Elderveld - Centraal Station - City Centre - Station Velperpoort - Velp (trolleybus)
 2 Centraal Station - City Centre - Kronenburg (Shopping Mall) - De Laar Oost - De Laar West (trolleybus)
 3 Het Duifje - City Centre - Centraal Station - Rijnstate (Hospital) - Alteveer - Burgers' Zoo (- Open Air Museum) (trolleybus)
 5 Schuytgraaf - Station Arnhem Zuid - Elderveld - Centraal Station - City Centre - Presikhaaf (Shopping Mall) - Presikhaaf (trolleybus)
 6 Centraal Station - City Centre - Presikhaaf (Shopping Mall) - Elsweide/HAN (University of Applied Sciences) (trolleybus)
 7 Rijkerswoerd - Kronenburg (Shopping Mall) - Gelredome (Stadium) - Centraal Station - City Centre - Station Velperpoort - Geitenkamp (trolleybus)
 8 Centraal Station - Rijnstate (Hospital) - Open Air Museum - Alteveer - Geitenkamp
 9 Schaarsbergen I.P.C. - Hoogkamp - Centraal Station
 10 Centraal Station - Het Dorp - Sportcentrum Papendal
 11 Station Arnhem Zuid - De Laar Oost - Vredenburg - Kronenburg (Shopping Mall) - Gelredome (Stadium) - Centraal Station
 12 Centraal Station - City Centre (South) - Presikhaaf - IJsseloord 1 - IJsseloord 2
 77 Centraal Station - City Centre - Station Velperpoort - CIOS

Regional services

 14 Arnhem - Elden - Elst - Oosterhout - Lent - Nijmegen 26 Arnhem - Presikhaaf - Velp - Giesbeek - Doesburg - Dieren 27 Arnhem - Presikhaaf - Velp - Giesbeek - Doesburg - Drempt - Hoog Keppel - Laag Keppel - Doetinchem 29 Arnhem - Velp - Rheden - Doesburg - Drempt - Hoog Keppel - Laag Keppel - Doetinchem 33 Arnhem - Malburgen-Oost - Huissen - Angeren - Doornenburg - Gendt - Bemmel - Lent - Nijmegen 43 Arnhem - Westervoort - Velp - Rheden - Ellecom - Dieren - Beekbergen - Apeldoorn 51 Arnhem - Oosterbeek - Doorwerth - Heelsum - Renkum - Wageningen 56 Arnhem - Driel - Heteren 60 Arnhem - Westervoort - Duiven - Zevenaar - Babberich - Lobith - Tolkamer 62 Arnhem - Westervoort - Duiven 72 Arnhem - Huissen 91 Arnhem - Beekbergen - Apeldoorn 105 Arnhem - Otterlo - Barneveld 231 Arnhem - De Maten (Apeldoorn) - Apeldoorn 300 Arnhem - Malburgen-Oost - Huissen - Bemmel - Nijmegen (Bus rapid transit service Brengdirect)
 331 Arnhem - Kronenburg - Elst - Nijmegen (Bus rapid transit service Brengdirect)
 352 Arnhem - Oosterbeek - Doorwerth - Heelsum - Renkum - Wageningen (Bus rapid transit service Brengdirect'')

References

External links

  Station Arnhem, train schedules and station facilities

Centraal
Railway stations on the IJssellijn
Railway stations on the Rhijnspoorweg
Railway stations on the Staatslijn A
Railway stations opened in 1845
1845 establishments in the Netherlands
Railway stations in the Netherlands opened in 1845